WDCN-LD, VHF digital channel 6, branded on air as La Nueva 87.7, is a low-powered Spanish-language television station licensed to Washington, D.C., United States. WDCN-LD markets itself as a conventional radio station broadcasting Spanish contemporary hits.

History
In the analog television era, stations on television channel 6 broadcast an FM audio signal at 87.75 MHz which is receivable by ordinary FM radios. These stations, colloquially known as "Franken-FMs", took advantage of this fact and a loophole in Federal Communications Commission (FCC) regulations that only require a television station to broadcast some kind of video content, not that the video and audio content are related.

Low-powered analog stations were exempt from the 2009 digital television transition, allowing WDCN-LP to continue operating as a Franken-FM. However, the later set a 2021 deadline for all low-powered stations to cease operating in analog. Several Franken-FMs proposed experimentally embedding an FM carrier at 87.7 MHz inside an ATSC 3.0 signal, which tests later showed to be technically feasible; the FCC is allowing this under special temporary authority, provided the stations broadcast at least one accompanying television service, and the FM and television signals have similar coverage.

WDCN-LP signed off on July 13, 2021, the day on which the FCC ended all analog television operation nationwide. It restarted operations on October 5, 2021, carrying The Country Network and the embedded "La Nueva" FM signal.

WDCN-LP previously simulcast on co-owned WOWZ-LP, another low-power channel 6 station, licensed to Salisbury, Maryland and serving the Ocean City-Salisbury area; that station has since switched to a simulcast of WVES.

Sports programming
From 2010 through 2012, WDCN-LP was the home for Spanish-language broadcasts of D.C. United soccer games. WDCN-LP carried all of the team's games, including those not broadcast on television.

Since the 2019 NFL season, WDCN-LD is the flagship Spanish-language radio station of the NFL's Baltimore Ravens.

Digital television

References

External links
Radio La Nueva 87.7 Online

Television channels and stations established in 1989
1989 establishments in Virginia
Television channels and stations disestablished in 2021
2021 disestablishments in Virginia
DCN-LP
DCN-LP
ATSC 3.0 television stations